Yesui was one of the wives of Genghis Khan, the founder of the Mongol Empire. She was of Tatar ancestry.

Like the other wives of Genghis Khan, she had her own ordo, or court and to her was assigned the Tuul River. Her sister Yesugen was also a wife of Genghis Khan. Both were the daughter of Yeke Cheren, a Tatar leader executed by Genghis Khan's army. She was fleeing with her first husband when her sister was captured. Yesugen convinced Genghis Khan to marry Yesui and that she, Yesugen, would submit to Yesui's seniority. Yesui was found and captured, her husband fled, and she agreed to marry the Khan. Though she did wield significant influence as a wife, this was far less than that wielded by Genghis Khan's first wife, Börte. In 1226, she accompanied her husband as he set out on a punitive expedition to the Tangut kingdom. When he fell ill, Yesui administered the government to hide his condition.

Notes

Sources
 

Women of the Mongol Empire
Genghis Khan
Tatar people
13th-century women rulers
12th-century Mongolian women
13th-century deaths
Year of birth unknown
Women in war in East Asia
Women in 13th-century warfare
Wives of Genghis Khan